Worton is an unincorporated community and census-designated place (CDP) in Kent County, Maryland, United States. As of the 2010 census it had a population of 249.

The Christ Church, Graveyard and Sexton's House complex was listed on the National Register of Historic Places in 1980.

Geography
It is bordered to the north by Butlertown.

Demographics

Education
It is in the Kent County Public Schools. Kent County Middle School is in Chestertown, and Kent County High School is in an unincorporated area, in the Butlertown census-designated place with a Worton postal address.

Worton Elementary School was formerly in the Butlertown CDP, with a Worton postal address. In 2017 the school board voted to close Worton Elementary School, with four members favoring and one against.

References

Census-designated places in Maryland
Census-designated places in Kent County, Maryland